Riah Hanna Abu El-Assal (born 6 November 1937 in Nazareth) is an Israeli Palestinian Anglican bishop, who was the Bishop in Jerusalem from 1997 to 2007.

History
Abu El-Assal graduated from Nazareth Baptist school where he also taught. While at Nazareth he was a member of the PLP, the Progressive List for Peace – a joint Jewish-Arab political party which, while existing only for eight years (1984–1992) is considered to have broken many previously sacrosanct taboos and profoundly influenced subsequent Israeli politics. During his time in Nazareth he was vicar of Christ Church, Nazareth.

In 1997, Abu El-Assal became the thirteenth Anglican Bishop of Jerusalem and head of the Episcopal Church in Jerusalem and the Middle East until his retirement on 31 March 2007 at the prescribed retirement age of 70 years, though he was only seven and a half months short of his 70th birthday.

Since retirement, Abu El-Assal has been engaged in a legal dispute with his successor and the Episcopal Diocese of Jerusalem over the ownership of the Bishop Riah Educational Campus, a school established by him when he was bishop.

Ministry

Abu El-Assal has traveled widely, raising support and finances for the Bishop Riah Educational Campus and other community programmes with a vision of peace in The Holy Land.

Abu El-Assal traveled to Australia in 2006 where he attended the Black Stump Music and Arts Festival.

Family
Riah Abu El-Assal is married to a niece of Emile Habibi. His grandfather started the first modern pilgrim service in 1893 and opened branches in Jaffa, Jerusalem, Nazareth and Tiberias. His son Hanna is currently principal of the Bishop Riah Educational Campus in Nazareth.

See also
Faik Haddad
Palestinian Christian
St. George's Cathedral, Jerusalem

References

Further reading
 (Autobiography)

External links
Robbie Low interviews Riah Abu el-Assal
Church urges action over Israel

Anglican bishops of Jerusalem
Palestinian Anglican priests
Palestinian bishops
People from Nazareth
1937 births
Living people
Arab citizens of Israel
Israeli Anglicans
Israeli Arab Christians